CCgroup is an international B2B tech PR and marketing consultancy headquartered in London.

History
CCgroup was founded in 1985 under the name Companycare Communications and in 1998 changed its name to CCgroup.

In 2013, a management buyout was announced, led by Richard Fogg and Paul Nolan.

CCgroup is a regular member of the annual PRWeek Top 150 Consultancies, as ranked by fee income, and The Holmes Report's Global 250 Agency Ranking. In January 2014 CCgroup joined the Public Relations Consultants Association

CCgroup is an insight-driven agency with specialist knowledge of four key tech markets:

•       Mobile and Telecoms

•	Fintech

•	Enterprise Technology
•	Deep Tech

CCgroup has recently won the following awards:

•	2020 PRMoment Awards – B2B Agency of the Year & Technology Agency of the Year

•	2020 PRWeek Best Places to Work - Mental Health Champion Award 

•	2020 PRWeek Best Places to Work - highly commended Best Small Agency and Training & Development  

•	2020 PRovoke EMEA Technology Consultancy of the Year 

CCgroup is frequently recognised in its industry for its regular industry-specific marketing research, including the following reports:

•	Security marketing strategies: influencing contemporary purchasing behaviour

•	Navigating telco turbulence: lessons for vendor marketing

References

Companies based in the London Borough of Camden
British companies established in 1985